Rhabdochaeta affinis is a species of tephritid or fruit flies in the genus Rhabdochaeta of the family Tephritidae.

Distribution
China.

References

Tephritinae
Insects described in 1939
Diptera of Asia